Kayamandi is a suburb of Stellenbosch in the Western Cape province of South Africa located off route R304. Kayamandi is one of the developing townships situated in Stellenbosch.

The name means "nice home" in the Xhosa language, from khaya meaning "home" and mnandi meaning "nice". It was founded in the early 1950s as part of the increased segregation during the apartheid regime. It was originally built to house exclusively black migrant male labourers employed on the farms in the Stellenbosch area. In 1966, the nine largest employers in the Stellenbosch district including Stellenbosch University, the town administration, several vineyards and a fruit packing company united to erect 38 ready-made homes, so called hostels.

The principal language spoken in Kayamandi is Xhosa, a tonal language which incorporates the use of click consonants, although there is widespread knowledge of both English and Afrikaans.

There are four schools in Kayamandi: Khayamandi High; Makhuphula High; Ikaya Primary; and Kayamandi Primary. Schools in Kayamandi include Kayamandi Secondary School, Makupula Secondary School and Ikaya Primary School.

There are many interesting projects done by young and old people of Kayamandi, such as Kayamandi Arts and Culture Festival. There are about 27 registered pre-schools and more than ten registered organisations such as Vision Africa, Prochorus, Lokxion Foundation, Legacy Center, Trust Center, Songo.Info, IMBADU etc.

Kayamandi is a soccer loving community with more than 20 teams, most of them playing informal soccer. Well known teams are Kuyasa FC, FC Malaga, Lokxion Stars FC, Kayamandi Hotspurs, Barca Juniors, Mighty Five Stars and FC Twetwe.

Further reading

External links

References

Stellenbosch
Populated places in the Stellenbosch Local Municipality
Townships in the Western Cape
1950s establishments in South Africa